Milhostov is a municipality and village in Cheb District in the Karlovy Vary Region of the Czech Republic. It has about 300 inhabitants.

Administrative parts
Villages of Hluboká and Vackovec are administrative parts of Milhostov.

References

Villages in Cheb District